George Howard Earle III (December 5, 1890December 30, 1974) was an American politician and diplomat from Pennsylvania. He was a member of the prominent Earle and Van Leer families and the 30th governor of Pennsylvania from 1935 to 1939. Earle was one of just two Democrats who served as governor of Pennsylvania between the Civil War and World War II.

The son of prominent attorney George Howard Earle Jr., Earle worked in his family's sugar business after graduating from Harvard University. During World War I, he commanded , a submarine chaser which was also his private yacht. Though raised a Republican, Earle joined the Democrats out of dissatisfaction with the Republican Party's handling of the Great Depression. He campaigned for Franklin D. Roosevelt in the 1932 presidential election and served as the U.S. Minister to Austria from 1933 to 1934. In this role, he warned the Roosevelt administration of the rising danger presented by Nazi Germany.

Earle defeated Republican William A. Schnader in the 1934 Pennsylvania gubernatorial election. As governor, he introduced an ambitious "Little New Deal" that sought to combat the effects of the Great Depression. Among other policies, his administration created a centralized Department of Public Assistance, eliminated the private police forces operated by several coal and steel companies, began construction of the Pennsylvania Turnpike, instituted Pennsylvania's first gasoline and cigarette tax, and established a forty-hour work week. The Little New Deal made Earle one of the most popular politicians in the country.

Earle sought election to the United States Senate in 1938, but he was defeated by incumbent Republican Senator James J. Davis. Earle was appointed as the Minister to Bulgaria in 1940 and served as a special emissary to the Balkans during World War II. He compiled a report blaming the Katyn massacre of Polish intelligentsia on the Soviet Union, but this report was suppressed. After the war, he served as assistant governor of American Samoa. He retired from public office and died in 1974.

Early life
Earle was born in Devon, Pennsylvania to George Howard Earle Jr. and  Catharine Hansell French, a wealthy family that traced its lineage in America to the arrival of the Mayflower. His grandmother Mrs. Frances ("Fanny") Van Leer was a member of one of the first Pennsylvania families, the Van Leer family and his great-grandfather Samuel Van Leer played an important role in the American Revolutionary War. He received a degree from Harvard University and subsequently worked abroad in a family-owned sugar business. He enlisted in the military in 1916 and was assigned to the Mexican border during the Pancho Villa Expedition. After the United States entered World War I, Earle commanded , a submarine chaser which was also his private yacht. He earned the Navy Cross in 1918 after averting a fatal explosion. After the war, Earle returned to private business, particularly in the sugar industry. Though raised as a Republican, Earle joined the Democratic Party over disillusionment with the Republican Party's handling of the Great Depression. After campaigning for Franklin Roosevelt in the 1932 election, Earle served as Ambassador to Austria from 1933 to 1934. Earle looked warily upon the Nazi Party, and warned the FDR Administration of the potential danger of Nazi Germany.

Governorship
Although Pennsylvania had not elected a Democratic governor in over forty years, Earle defeated Republican Attorney General William A. Schnader in the 1934 Pennsylvania gubernatorial election. Though Earle faced a split legislature in the first half of his term, his party gained control of both chambers of the Pennsylvania legislature in the 1936 election. An ardent Roosevelt admirer, Earle rolled out an ambitious "Little New Deal", which resulted in the introduction of a record 3514 bills during the 1935-36 session of the Pennsylvania General Assembly. His administration created a centralized Department of Public Assistance that was designed to ensure uniform allocation of relief payments. Earle's government also sought to ameliorate ongoing labor strife by increasing union bargaining rights and eliminating the private police forces operated by many of the influential coal and steel companies. Pennsylvania Turnpike construction also began during his tenure. Other bills passed include Pennsylvania's first gasoline and cigarette tax, teacher tenure, and a maximum forty-hour work week. Earle's administration relaxed Pennsylvania's Blue laws, passed the nation's first milk control law, and outlawed company police forces hired by mining companies.

Earle's "Little New Deal" earned him a place on the cover of Time magazine in 1937, and a Gallup poll that same year saw him named the nation's third most popular Democrat (after the president and vice president). However, Earle also became known for his mercurial temperament and his administration was plagued by high-profile corruption charges involving his top officials. Earle's poor relationship with the state's judicial hierarchy resulted in one of his central policy goals, the imposition of a graduated income tax, being declared unconstitutional. Earle, who was constitutionally ineligible to run for a second consecutive term as governor, ran for the Senate in 1938, but lost to incumbent Republican James J. Davis. Earle's loss to Davis coincided with a Republican landslide that saw Republicans re-gain control of the legislature and governorship. Pennsylvania would not elect another Democratic governor until 1954.

Post-governorship
Earle was appointed as Minister to Austria on July 24, 1933, and served until March 25, 1934. He was appointed Minister to Bulgaria on February 14, 1940, and served until December 13, 1941. During World War II, he served again in the United States Navy, this time as a lieutenant commander and as a special emissary to the Balkans, where Earle proposed a plan that he believed might bring the war in Europe to an early end. The German ambassador and the head of the German secret service had secretly proposed a coup against Adolf Hitler that would end with Hitler turned over to the US as a war criminal, but the plot was not approved by the US government.

In 1944, President Roosevelt assigned Earle to compile information on the Katyń massacre, the massacre of the Polish intelligentsia by the Soviet government. Earle did so, using contacts in Bulgaria and Romania, and concluded that the Soviet Union was guilty. After consulting with Elmer Davis, the director of the Office of War Information, Roosevelt rejected Earle's conclusion, saying that he was convinced of the responsibility of Nazi Germany, and ordered Earle's report suppressed.  At this time, the United States and Soviet Union were still fighting Nazi Germany and Japan.
When Earle formally requested permission to publish his findings, the President gave him a written order to desist. 
Earle was reassigned and spent the rest of World War II in American Samoa.

After the war, Earle served as assistant governor of American Samoa, and then returned to the private sector. Ambassador Ralph Earle II is his son.

He died on December 30, 1974, and was interred at the Church of the Redeemer cemetery in Bryn Mawr, Pennsylvania.

References

External links

George Howard Earle Papers

1890 births
1974 deaths
20th-century American politicians
Ambassadors of the United States to Austria
Ambassadors of the United States to Bulgaria
Burials in Pennsylvania
Democratic Party governors of Pennsylvania
Earle family
Harvard University alumni
People from Chester County, Pennsylvania
Recipients of the Navy Cross (United States)
United States naval attachés
United States Navy officers
Van Leer family